Teeradetch Metawarayut (born September 15, 1989), nicknamed Alek is an actor on Channel 3.

Early life 
Alek is the second son of the family. He has 3 siblings, 1 brother, and 1 sister. He graduated high school from Assumption College and then from graduated Faculty of Sports Science at Chulalongkorn University with second class honors. His nickname was originally given to him by his father as Alex, from the name Alexander. But because his family is Thai people of Chinese descent, his father said, "I'm afraid that it might not be suitable for the English name." Therefore, his father changed his mind and use the name Alek instead.

Career 
Started into the industry by shooting commercials and music videos. He became known from the movie "Crazy Crying Lady" starred Araya A. Hargate, then he has many other works following. Alek signed under Channel 3. In 2015, he was nominated for a Golden Television Award in the category of Best Supporting Actor in the drama Sapai Jao (2015) for the role of "Khun Chai Lek”.

Filmography

Film

Television

Musicals

Music videos appearances

Master of Ceremony: MC

Discography

Soundtracks

Awards and nominations

References

External links 
 
 

Living people
1989 births
Teeradetch Metawarayut
Teeradetch Metawarayut
Teeradetch Metawarayut
Teeradetch Metawarayut
Teeradetch Metawarayut
Teeradetch Metawarayut
Teeradetch Metawarayut
Teeradetch Metawarayut
Teeradetch Metawarayut